Alexis-Joseph Mazerolle (29 June 1826 – 29 May 1889) was a French painter.

Life

Alexis-Joseph Mazerolle was born on 29 June 1826. His father, Jean-Baptiste, was a carpenter and his mother, Madeleine Vitry, was a laundress. He was their third child. He was admitted to the École des Arts et Métiers (School of Arts and Crafts), where he showed unusual ability in drawing. 
In 1843, at the age of 17, he was admitted to the  École des Beaux-Arts where he was a pupil of Marc-Charles-Gabriel Gleyre.
He also studied under Pierre Dupuis.

Mazerolle's first submission to the Salon was in 1857 with The Old Woman and the Two Servants.
He continued to be a regular exhibitor in the Salon for most of his life.
In 1857 he won a 3rd class medal for Chilperic and Fregigonde, and in 1859 won a "rappel" for Nero and Locusta Experimenting with Poisons upon a Slave. He won a second "rappel" in 1861.
Most of his paintings were of historical or mythological subjects.

In 1861 Mazerolle married Aglaé Hourdou. They had two sons.
He served in the National Guard during the Siege of Paris in 1870.
He was awarded the Legion of Honour in 1870.
In the early years of the French Third Republic Mazerolle created decorative tapestry designs for the Manufacture Nationale des Gobelins.
In 1880 President Jules Grévy made him an officer of the Legion of Honour when the new ceiling of the  Théâtre Français was inaugurated, for which he received much praise.
He died on 29 May 1889 from an attack of asthma, aged 62.

Work in public collections

Mazerolle is perhaps best known for his painting of Nero Experimenting with Poison on a Slave, held by the Palais des Beaux-Arts de Lille.
He is also known for his ceiling paintings at the Comédie-Française and the Théâtre du Vaudeville in Paris, and for the Nine Muses and Six Geniuses for the Conservatoire de Paris.
Works in public collections include:
 Petit Palais, Paris, Le triomphe de Bacchus
 Bibliothèque-musée de la Comédie-Française, Paris, La France couronnant Molière, Corneille et Racine, esquisse du plafond 
 Palais Garnier, Paris, Le Café, Le Thé, La Pêche, La Pâtisserie, Les Glaces, Le Vin, Les Fruits, La Chasse (1873-1875), tapestries from the Manufacture des Gobelins for the rotunda of the Salon de Glacier Conservatoire de Paris, stage set 
 Bourse de commerce de Paris, cupola
 Grand theater of Angers, foyer ceiling
 Palais des Beaux-Arts de Lille, Néron et Locuste essayant des poisons sur un esclave 
 Musée départemental de l'Oise, Beauvais, cartons pour tapisserie Le Vin, Le Thé, Les Fruits, Le Sommeil d'Holophène, Adam et Ève,  biblical frescoes from the villa Stoltz
 La Piscine Museum, Roubaix, Éponine suppliant Vespasien Musée Antoine Vivenel, Compiègne, Kiki Charlotte Musée des Beaux-Arts de Rouen, L'Opium Musée des Beaux-Arts de Strasbourg, portrait of his two sons Louis et Fernand   
 Musée Condé, Chantilly, Oise, four decorative panels, Vases de fleurs Musée d'Angoulême, Angoulême
 Théâtre de Baden-Baden, Germany, cupola of the room
 Hermitage Museum, Saint Petersburg, Russia, tapestry La filleule des fées Mildred Lane Kemper Art Museum, St. Louis, US, Les Agapes National Fine Arts Museum, Buenos Aires, Argentina, Psyché à la source''

Notes

Sources

1826 births
1889 deaths
19th-century French painters